Grzybowski (feminine: Grzybowska; plural: Grzybowscy) is a surname of Polish-language origin.

People 
 Henryk Grzybowski (1934-2012), Polish footballer
 Józef Grzybowski (1869-1922), Polish geologist
 Katarzyna Grzybowska (born 1989), Polish table tennis player
 Magdalena Grzybowska (born 1978), Polish tennis player
 Marcin Grzybowski (born 1979), Polish canoer
 Marian Grzybowski (1895-1949), Polish dermatologist
 Peter Grzybowski (1954-2013), Polish artist
 Wacław Grzybowski (1887-1959), Polish politician
 Zbigniew Grzybowski (born 1976), Polish footballer

Polish-language surnames